The Dark Tower: The Gunslinger Born is a seven-issue comic book limited series published by Marvel Comics. It is the first comic book miniseries based on Stephen King's The Dark Tower series of novels. It is plotted by Robin Furth, scripted by Peter David, and illustrated by Jae Lee and Richard Isanove. Stephen King serves as Creative and Executive Director of the project. The first issue was published on February 7, 2007.

Overview
The first issue of The Gunslinger Born was released at midnight on February 7, 2007. Creators Peter David and Jae Lee, and Marvel Editor-in-Chief Joe Quesada appeared at a midnight signing at a Times Square, New York City comic book store to promote it.

The Gunslinger Born is an expansion and interpretation of events covered in The Dark Tower series, beginning with Roland Deschain's manhood test against Cort and ending with the last events of the flashback sequences in Wizard and Glass.  Furth indicated that later arcs would "cover the time period between Roland leaving Hambry and the fall of Gilead".

Issues

Related releases
The Dark Tower: The Gunslinger Born Sketchbook
Marvel Spotlight: The Dark Tower
The Dark Tower: Gunslinger's Guidebook

Collected editions
The entire seven-issue run of The Gunslinger Born was collected into a hardcover edition, released by Marvel on November 7, 2007, though it does not include the prose work that ran in the individual issues. A paperback edition was later released on May 19, 2010. The series was also included in the hardcover release of The Dark Tower Omnibus on September 21, 2011.

On August 28, 2018, Gallery 13 republished the original hardcover collection as Stephen King's The Dark Tower: Beginnings - The Gunslinger Born (Book 1).  On October 23, 2018, this edition (along with Books 2-5) was included in the boxed set Stephen King's The Dark Tower: Beginnings - The Complete Graphic Novel Series.

See also
The Dark Tower (comics)
List of comics based on fiction
Weird West

References

External links
Official site at Marvel.com

Richard Isanove on The Dark Tower at Newsarama
Interview with Joe Quesada about the series at Lilja's Library
Interview with Richard isanove about the series at Lilja's Library
Interview with Peter David about the series at Lilja's Library
Interview with Robin Furth about the series at Lilja's Library
Interview with Ralph Macchio about the series at Lilja's Library
Dark Tower Official Site
Heroes Con 2007 Panel Discussion with Peter David and Robin Firth (Audio) at The Dollar Bin
Interviews with Joe Quesada, Jae Lee and Peter David at The Comic Collective

2007 comics debuts
2007 comics endings
Comics by Peter David
Gunslinger Born, The